Cruciferous vegetables are vegetables of the family Brassicaceae (also called Cruciferae) with many genera, species, and cultivars being raised for food production such as cauliflower, cabbage, kale, garden cress, bok choy, broccoli, Brussels sprouts, mustard plant and similar green leaf vegetables.  The family takes its alternative name (Cruciferae, New Latin for "cross-bearing") from the shape of their flowers, whose four petals resemble a cross.

Ten of the most common cruciferous vegetables eaten by people, known colloquially in North America as cole crops and in the UK, Ireland and Australia as brassicas, are in a single species (Brassica oleracea); they are not distinguished from one another taxonomically, only by horticultural category of cultivar groups.  Numerous other genera and species in the family are also edible.  Cruciferous vegetables are one of the dominant food crops worldwide. They are high in vitamin C and soluble fiber and contain multiple nutrients and phytochemicals.

List of cruciferous vegetables 

Extensive selective breeding has produced a large variety of cultivars, especially within the genus Brassica.  One description of genetic factors involved in the breeding of Brassica species is the Triangle of U.

Further relationships inside the family Brassicaceae can be described by tribes, a grouping of genera (see ). Armoracia, Barbarea, and Nasturtium belong to the tribe Cardamineae; Brassica, Sinapis, Diplotaxis, Eruca, and Raphanus belong to Brassiceae; Lepidium belongs in Lepidieae; and finally Wasabia (Eutrema) belongs in Eutremeae.

Research 
According to an umbrella review of 41 systematic reviews and meta-analyses of 303 observational studies, there is suggestive evidence for beneficial associations in gastric cancer, lung cancer, endometrial cancer, and all-cause mortality.

Cancer 
Cruciferous vegetables contain glucosinolates, which are under research for their potential  to affect  cancer. Glucosinolates are hydrolyzed to isothiocyanates (ITCs) by   myrosinase.  ITCs  are being investigated for their chemopreventive and chemotherapeutic effects.

Drug and toxin metabolism  

Chemicals contained in cruciferous vegetables induce the expression of the liver enzyme CYP1A2. 

Alliaceous and cruciferous vegetable consumption may induce glutathione S-transferases, uridine diphosphate-glucuronosyl transferases, and quinone reductases all of which are potentially involved in detoxification of carcinogens such as aflatoxin. High consumption of cruciferous vegetables has potential risk from allergies and interference with drugs such as warfarin and genotoxicity.

Taste 

Contraindications 

Although cruciferous vegetables are generally safe for human consumption, individuals with known allergies or hypersensitivities to a certain Brassica vegetable, or those taking anticoagulant therapy, should be cautious.

References 

Vegetables
Brassicaceae